A special election was held in the U.S. state of Minnesota on February 9, 2016, to elect a new senator for District 35 in the Minnesota Senate, caused by the resignation of Senator Branden Petersen, effective on October 31, 2015. A primary election was held on January 12, 2016, to nominate a Republican Party of Minnesota candidate. Former state representative Jim Abeler, the Republican nominee, won the special election.

Candidates

Republican Party of Minnesota
The Senate District 35 Republican Party held a convention to endorse a candidate on November 14. Andy Aplikowski won the endorsement after four rounds of balloting. Former state representative Jim Abeler said he would continue to seek the Republican nomination. Don Huizenga was undecided on whether he would continue to seek the nomination, but ultimately did not file a candidacy. Brad Sunderland said he would abide by the endorsement.

 Jim Abeler, former state representative and candidate for the 2014 U.S. Senate Republican nomination
 Andy Aplikowski, party activist

Withdrawn
 Alex Huffman, business owner and former U.S. Army serviceman
 Don Huizenga, party activist
 Reid Oines
 Brad Sunderland, chair of the Senate District 35 Republican Party

Minnesota Democratic–Farmer–Labor Party
The Senate District 35 Democratic–Farmer–Labor Party endorsed Roger Johnson on December 16, 2015.

 Roger Johnson, community activist

Legal Marijuana Now Party
 Zach Phelps

Primary election results

Results

Previous election results

See also
 List of special elections to the Minnesota Senate

References

External links
 Information on the special election at the Minnesota Secretary of State website

2016 Minnesota elections
Government of Minnesota
2016 in politics
Minnesota special elections